Wilmot Collins (born October 15, 1963) is a Liberian-born American politician serving as the mayor of Helena, Montana. He defeated four-term incumbent mayor James E. Smith in the 2017 mayoral election on November 7, 2017, with 51% of the vote. This victory made him the first black person to be elected the mayor of any city in the history of Montana since statehood was achieved in 1889.

Early life and background
Collins fled his native Liberia for Helena in 1994, as a refugee from the First Liberian Civil War. He had petitioned for refugee status to join his wife, who had moved to Montana two years before he did. He subsequently became a United States citizen in 2002, and worked for the Montana Department of Health and Human Services, specializing in child protection.

For over two decades, he was a member of the United States Navy Reserve. Collins has two children with his wife, their daughter, Jaymie and their son, Bliss. Wilmot Collins is first cousins with Helene Cooper, Pentagon correspondent for The New York Times.

Political career 
On May 13, 2019, Collins announced his candidacy for United States Senate as a Democrat. He dropped out to endorse governor Steve Bullock on March 9, 2020.

On March 29, 2021, Collins announced his intent to seek re-election as mayor of Helena. In his announcement, Collins listed climate friendly policies for the city, affordable housing and funding of essential services as his core accomplishments during his first term.

Collins won re-election as mayor of Helena on November 2, 2021. He defeated his opponent, Sonda Gaub with 67% of the vote, making him the first black person to win re-election for any office in the state of Montana. 

In 2021, Collins spoke in support of resettling Afghan refugees amid the 2021 Taliban offensive on Twitter, stating: "This former refugee cannot wait to welcome them to Montana. Hopefully they’ll get involved in our communities and enrich our lives with their experiences and culture. Who knows, maybe one day some of them will even run for office!"

Notes

References

External links 
 Mayor Wilmot J. Collins at helenamt.gov

1963 births
African-American mayors in Montana
American politicians of Liberian descent
Americo-Liberian people
People of Americo-Liberian descent
Liberian refugees
Living people
Mayors of places in Montana
Montana Democrats
Politicians from Helena, Montana
Politicians from Monrovia
Refugees in the United States
United States Navy reservists
Candidates in the 2020 United States elections
University of Liberia alumni
Troy University alumni